Sergei Valerianovich Bazarevich (born 16 March 1965) is a Russian former professional basketball player and coach.

Bazarevich was a regular member of the senior Russian national basketball team, with whom he won silver medals at the EuroBasket 1993 and the 1994 FIBA World Championship. He was named to the All-Tournament Team in both competitions. He also holds Greek citizenship, under the name Sergei Bazarevits.

He was the head coach of the Russian national team from 2016 to 2021.

Professional career
Bazarevich started his career with in 1983, with CSKA Moscow, in the USSR League. With CSKA, he won 3 USSR League championships, in the years 1983, 1984, and 1988. He then moved to the USSR League club Dynamo Moscow in 1988.

He was a member of the FIBA European Selection in 1991. In 1992, he moved to the Turkish League club Yıldırımspor, and in 1993, he joined the Turkish League club Tofas Bursa. He then moved to the NBA, when he signed with the Atlanta Hawks, for the 1994–95 season.

After being released by the Hawks, he signed with the Spanish League club Caceres Club Baloncesto. He was also a member of the FIBA European Selection in 1995.

He moved back to Dynamo Moscow for the 1995–96 season, and then back to CSKA Moscow. He was also a two time FIBA EuroStar selection, in 1996 and 1997. While a member of CSKA, he won two Russian Championships, in the years 1997 and 1998.

He also played with the Turkish League club Türk Telekom, the Italian League club Pallacanestro Gorizia, the Greek League club PAOK Thessaloniki, the EuroLeague club St. Petersburg Lions, and the Italian League club Pallacanestro Trieste, before finally returning once again to Dynamo Moscow.

National team career
Bazarevich was a member of the junior national teams of the Soviet Union. He played with the Soviet Union's junior national team at the 1984 FIBA Europe Under-18 Championship, where he won the gold medal. He also represented the Soviet Union at the 1985 Summer Universiade, where he also won a gold medal.

He was also a member of the senior men's Soviet Union national team. He played at the 1990 FIBA World Championship, where he won the silver medal.

After the Soviet Union broke up, Bazarevich represented Russia. He played with the senior men's Russian national team at the FIBA EuroBasket 1993, where he won a silver medal, and at the 1994 FIBA World Championship, where he won another silver medal. He was named to the All-Tournament Team in both competitions.

He also represented Russia at the EuroBasket 1995. In addition to this, he was also a member of the CIS Olympic team at the 1992 Summer Olympics and the Russian Olympic team at the 2000 Summer Olympics.

Awards and accomplishments

Playing career

Pro clubs
3× USSR League Champion: (1983, 1984, 1988)
2× FIBA European Selection: (1991, 1995)
2× FIBA EuroStar: (1996, 1997)
2× Russian Championship Champion: (1997, 1998)

Soviet junior national team
1984 FIBA Europe Under-18 Championship: 
1985 Summer Universiade:

Soviet senior national team
1990 FIBA World Championship:

Russian senior national team
1993 EuroBasket: 
1993 EuroBasket: All-Tournament Team
1994 FIBA World Championship: 
1994 FIBA World Championship: All-Tournament Team
Honored Master of Sports of Russia: (1994)

Coaching career

Pro clubs
2× Russian Cup Winner: (2012, 2013)
FIBA EuroChallenge Champion: (2013)

NBA career statistics

Regular season

|-
| align="left" | 1994–95
| align="left" | Atlanta
| 10 || 0 || 7.4 || .500 || .167 || .778 || 0.7 || 1.4 || .1 || .1 || 3.0
|-
| align="left" | Career
| align="left" | 
| 10 || 0 || 7.4 || .500 || .167 || .778 || 0.7 || 1.4 || .1 || .1 || 3.0

References

External links
NBA.com Profile

Euroleague.net Profile
Olympics Profile
FIBA EuroLeague Profile
FIBA Profile
FIBA Europe Profile
Spanish League Profile 
EuroCup Coaching Profile
FIBA EuroChallenge Coaching Profile

1965 births
Living people
Atlanta Hawks players
Basketball players at the 1992 Summer Olympics
Basketball players at the 2000 Summer Olympics
BC Dynamo Moscow coaches
BC Dynamo Moscow players
BC Krasnye Krylia coaches
BC Samara coaches
Greek basketball coaches
Greek expatriate basketball people in the United States
Greek men's basketball players
Greek people of Russian descent
Liga ACB players
National Basketball Association players from Greece
National Basketball Association players from Russia
Olympic basketball players of Russia
Olympic basketball players of the Unified Team
P.A.O.K. BC players
Pallacanestro Cantù coaches
Pallacanestro Pavia players
Pallacanestro Trieste players
PBC CSKA Moscow players
PBC Lokomotiv-Kuban coaches
Point guards
Russian basketball coaches
Russian expatriate basketball people in Greece
Russian expatriate basketball people in Italy
Russian expatriate basketball people in Spain
Russian expatriate basketball people in Turkey
Russian expatriate basketball people in the United States
Russian men's basketball players
Russian people of Greek descent
Shooting guards
Soviet men's basketball players
Basketball players from Moscow
Tofaş S.K. players
Türk Telekom B.K. players
Undrafted National Basketball Association players
1990 FIBA World Championship players
Universiade medalists in basketball
Universiade gold medalists for the Soviet Union
Medalists at the 1985 Summer Universiade
1994 FIBA World Championship players